Mikko Tolvanen (born 17 July 1988, in Vantaa) is a Finnish professional ice hockey goaltender who currently plays for Espoo Blues of the SM-liiga.

References

External links

1988 births
Living people
Sportspeople from Vantaa
Espoo Blues players
Finnish ice hockey goaltenders